Leonora Brito (7 July 1954 – 14 June 2007) was a Welsh writer from Cardiff, Wales.

Biography
Brito was born in Cardiff on 7 July 1954. She studied Law and History at Cardiff University. In 1991 she won the Rhys Davies Short Story Prize. Her first short story collection, Dat's Love (1995), was published by Seren Books and was described by Publishers Weekly as combining 'an unexpected setting (the Caribbean community in Wales) with some truly fresh writing'. In an article for The Guardian, Gary Younge states that 'with the exception of Leonora Brito's Dat's Love, the literary voices of blacks and Asians in Wales are rarely heard.'

Brito's Chequered Histories (2006), another short story collection, was also published by Seren. In addition to prose, she wrote successfully for radio and television. She died in 2007.

Publications

 1995: Dat's Love, Seren
2006: Chequered Histories, Seren

References 

1954 births
2007 deaths
20th-century British short story writers
21st-century British short story writers
20th-century Welsh writers
21st-century Welsh writers
20th-century Welsh women writers
21st-century Welsh women writers
Afro-Caribbean culture
Welsh short story writers
Writers from Cardiff
British women short story writers
Alumni of Cardiff University